The subgenus Hermodactyloides of Iris includes all reticulate-bulbed bulbous irises. It was formerly named as a genus, Iridodictyum by Rodionenko in 1961. but it was not widely accepted and most botanists preferred 'Hermodactyloides'.

Édouard Spach named the genus in 1846.  The word 'Hermodactyloides' comes from 'Hermes' , a Greek God, and 'daktylos' - finger. The name for the subgenus is very similar to Hermodactylus (the former name for Iris tuberosa), which was originally a separate genus to irises, but in 2001 was re-classified to be within the Hermodactyloides sub-genus.

Most species are native to central Europe and central Asia. They mostly have one or two long leaves and flower in early spring.

Taxonomy
The subgenus Hermodactyloides is subdivided into two sections; Reticulatae and Monolepsis. Known species include:

Section Reticulatae
 Iris danfordiae Baker.
 Iris histrio Rchb. f.
 Iris histrioides G.F.Wilson.
 Iris hyrcana Woronow ex Grossh.
 Iris pamphylica Hedge.
 Iris reticulata Bieberstein. (includes Iris reticulata var. bakeriana Mathew and Wendlebo)
 Iris tuberosa (formerly Hermodactylus tuberosus) L.
 Iris vartanii Fost.
 Iris winogradowii Fomin.
 Iris zagrica Brian Mathews and Mehdi Zarrei

Section Monolepsis
Originally Rodionenko created the genus Alatavia for Iris kolpakowskiana and I. winkleri, but it was not validly published. B.Mathew then changed the name in 1989 to Iris sect. Monolepsis, after his re-organization of the genus. Molecular evidence places Monolepis as sister to a clade including section Reticulatae (including Hermodactylus), [[Iris subg. Xiphium|subgenus Xiphium]] and subsection Syriacae'' of section Limniris.

Having flattened crocus-like leaves;
 Iris kolpakowskiana Regel.
 Iris winkleri Regal.

Cultivation
This genus of dwarf bulbous iris is mostly used in rock gardens, or planted by specialist collectors in bulb frames.

References

Iris (plant)
Plant subgenera